"Bellissima" is a song by Italian singer Annalisa. It was written by Annalisa, Davide Simonetta and Paolo Antonacci, and produced by Simonetta.

It was released by Warner Music Italy on 2 September 2022 as the lead single from her upcoming eighth album. The song peaked at number seven on the FIMI Singles Chart.

Music video
A music video to accompany the release of "Bellissima", directed by Giulio Rosati, was released onto YouTube on the same day.

Charts

Weekly charts

Year-end charts

Certifications

References

2022 singles
2022 songs
Annalisa songs
Songs written by Davide Simonetta
Songs written by Annalisa